is a former Japanese football player.

Playing career
Ryuta Miyauchi played for J1 League club; Kashima Antlers from 2012 to 2014.

References

External links

1994 births
Living people
Association football people from Chiba Prefecture
Japanese footballers
J1 League players
J3 League players
Kashima Antlers players
J.League U-22 Selection players
Association football midfielders